Doddenham is a hamlet and civil parish (with Knightwick) in the Malvern Hills district in  the county of Worcestershire, England.

Doddenham was in the lower division of Doddingtree Hundred.

A notable landscape feature is Ankerdine Hill.

References

Hamlets in Worcestershire
Civil parishes in Worcestershire
Malvern Hills District